The Archives Nationales de Mauritanie (National Archives of Mauritania) is the national archives of Mauritania. It was founded in 1955 and hold 3,000 volumes. As of 2007 it was located on Avenue de l'Indépendance. Directors have included Mohamed Ould Gaouad (circa 1974), Izidh Bih Ould Sidi Mohamed (circa 2007), and Mohamed Moctar Ould Sidi Mohamed (circa 2017).

See also 
 National Library of Mauritania
 List of national archives

References

Bibliography
  

Mauritania
Mauritanian culture
History of Mauritania